Cape Lazarev is a cape on the southern shore of the Sevastopol Bay (Black Sea) on the Crimean Peninsula.

Cape is named after Russian fleet commander and explorer Mikhail Petrovich Lazarev.

Sources
 Лазарева, мыс // Топонимический словарь Севастополя. EdwART. 2011

Landforms of Sevastopol
Lazarev
Lazarev